These are the results of the Women's 1500 metres event at the 1995 World Championships in Athletics in Gothenburg, Sweden.

Gone were the Chinese sensations of two years earlier, not a single representative in this field, their only distance running representative in these championships incapable of making a final.  The start of the final was aggressive but slow as a lot of elbows were flying as athletes maneuvered for position at a slow pace.  1991 champion and Olympic champion Hassiba Boulmerka wanted to go into her customary second spot but found it difficult to find a leader.  After 200 meters, Yvonne Mai-Graham ran around the crowd to self nominate herself into the lead, followed by Boulmerka.  The leaders remained in that position for a kilometer, with the chasers right behind jockeying for position.  Coming in to the final lap, Kelly Holmes had positioned herself in third place.  Crossing the start line for the final time, the fireworks began.  Boulmerka ran past Mai with Holmes less than a metre behind.  With 200 to go, Boulmerka and Holmes were running stride for stride, Holmes on the outside of the turn.  Carla Sacramento was the next chaser and the medalists were decided with a breakaway.  By the end of the turn, Boulmerka had won the battle, but she pulled into lane 2.  Holmes lined herself up in lane 1 to make a run at Boulmerka, but instead the gap kept slowly widening.

Medalists

Results

Heats
First 6 of each heat (Q) and the next 6 fastest (q) qualified for the semifinals.

Semifinals
First 5 of each heat (Q) and the next 2 fastest (q) qualified for the final.

Final

References
 Results
 IAAF

- Women's 1500 Metres
1500 metres at the World Athletics Championships
1995 in women's athletics